Members of the New South Wales Legislative Assembly who served in the 25th parliament of New South Wales held their seats from 1920 to 1922. They were elected at the 1920 state election on 20 March 1920. The Speaker was Daniel Levy with the exception of 13–20 December 1921 when he was replaced by Simon Hickey.

Between 1920 and 1927 the Legislative Assembly was elected using a form of proportional representation with multi-member seats and a single transferable vote (modified Hare-Clark). There was confusion at the time as to the process to be used to fill the vacancy. When George Beeby resigned on 9 August 1920, in accordance with the practice prior to 1920, the Speaker of the Legislative Assembly issued a writ of election requiring a by-election to be conducted, however the Chief Electoral Officer said he couldn't do so under the law at the time and that a by-election would be contrary to the principle of proportional representation. The vacancies were left unfilled until the Parliament passed the Parliamentary Elections (Casual Vacancies) Act on 10 December 1920, so that casual vacancies were filled by the next unsuccessful candidate on the incumbent member's party list. If an Independent member retired, the Clerk of the Assembly determined who would fill the vacancy based on the departing members voting record on questions of confidence.

See also
Storey ministry
First Dooley ministry
First Fuller ministry
Second Dooley ministry
Results of the 1920 New South Wales state election
Candidates of the 1920 New South Wales state election

References

Members of New South Wales parliaments by term
20th-century Australian politicians